Savage Intruder, later released as Hollywood Horror House, is a 1970 American psychological horror film directed by Donald Wolfe and starring Miriam Hopkins, John David Garfield and Gale Sondergaard.

Plot
An ageing and reclusive former film star, who lives in a mansion with a small staff of housekeepers, hires a disturbed young man as her personal nurse. At the same time a serial killer has been murdering and dismembering women in the Hollywood Hills.

Cast
 Miriam Hopkins as Katharine Packard 
 David Garfield as Vic Valance (as John David Garfield)
 Gale Sondergaard as Leslie 
 Florence Lake as Mildred 
 Virginia Wing as Greta 
 Lester Matthews as Ira Jaffee 
 Riza Royce as Mrs. Jaffee 
 Joe Besser as Bus Driver 
 Charles Martin as Doctor
 Jason Johnson as Josef 
 Bill Welsh as TV Announcer 
 Minta Durfee as Guest

References

Bibliography
 Axel Nissen. Actresses of a Certain Character: Forty Familiar Hollywood Faces from the Thirties to the Fifties. McFarland, 2007.

External links

1970 films
1970s horror thriller films
1970 horror films
American horror thriller films
Films scored by Stu Phillips
1970s English-language films
1970s American films